Orhan Gencebay (born Orhan Kencebay, 4 August 1944) is a Turkish musician, bağlama virtuoso, composer, singer, arranger, music producer, music director, and actor. Gencebay was born in the coastal town of Samsun on 4 August 1944. He is of Crimean Tatar descent. In 1998, he was named a State Artist of Turkey.

Career
At ages 20 and 22, he passed the Turkish Radio and Television Corporation (TRT) auditions and became a resident bağlama player at the network for several months. In 1966, he was one of the primary contestants in National Bağlama Contest with Arif Sağ and Cinuçen Tanrıkorur, two other contemporary masters of Turkish music.

In the late sixties, he collaborated with a wide range of musicians in performances and film music. Between 1966 and 1968, he played bağlama with Arif Sağ in many records with singers such as Muzaffer Akgün, Yıldız Tezcan, Gülden Karaböcek, Ahmet Sezgin, Şükran Ay, Sabahat Akkiraz, and Nuri Sesigüzel. Gencebay also took part as a music director in many Turkish films such as Ana, Kuyu, Kızılırmak-Karakoyun. He also collaborated with many musicians from different genres, such as Erkin Koray, Omar Faruk Tekbilek, Ismet Siral, Burhan Tonguc, Ozer Senay, Vedat Yildirimbora, Neşet Ertaş, Abdullah Nail Bayşu. He appeared as a baglama performer and a well-known composer in musical societies, besides releasing several singles in genre of traditional Turkish folk music. In 1968, he released his first "free-style" single "Sensiz Bahar Gecmiyor/Basa Gelen Cekilirmis", and was rewarded. During the 1970s, he released many singles in a new genre that is a fusion of traditional Turkish folk music, Turkish classical music, Western classical music, jazz, rock, country, progressive, psychedelic, Indian, Arabic, Spanish, and Greek music styles. Even though some musical societies such as TRT named that kind of World fusion music recordings Arabesque music, Orhan Gencebay refused the term arabesque, saying it was inadequate to define his style. In 1972, he founded the Kervan Record Company, attracting many other talented musicians such as Erkin Koray, Ajda Pekkan, Muazzez Abacı, Mustafa Sağyaşar, Ahmet Özhan, Kamuran Akkor, Semiha Yankı, Samime Sanay, Neşe Karaböcek, Bedia Akartürk, Nil Burak, Ziya Taşkent, Semiramis Pekkan and Ferdi Özbeğen.

Throughout his career, Orhan has performed leading roles in 36 movies, has been a composer almost in 90 movies, composed of about a thousand works, released almost 35 singles, 15 albums, and dozens of MCs. His albums sold out over 65 million legal copies.

Discography

Studio albums

Filmography 

Movie soundtracks 
 Kızılırmak-Karakoyun, 1967
 Kozanoğlu, 1967
 Ana, 1967
 Kuyu, 1968
 Kara Gözlüm, 1970

TV shows
 Orhan Abi Halk Show, presenter, TGRT, 1996–1997
 Popstar Alaturka, judge, Star TV, 2006–2008
 Popstar 2013, judge, Star TV, 2013

References

External links
 
Turkish Progressive Music and Orhan Gencebay
Official website

1944 births
Living people
People from Samsun
Turkish male singers
Turkish folk musicians
Turkish singer-songwriters
Turkish folk-pop singers
Turkish-language singers
State Artists of Turkey
Turkish people of Crimean Tatar descent
Turkish male film actors